This is a listing of all of the episodes of the television sitcom All in the Family, which originally aired on CBS from 1971 to 1979.

Series overview

Episodes

Pilot episodes

Season 1 (1971)

Season 2 (1971–72)

Season 3 (1972–73)

Season 4 (1973–74)

Season 5 (1974–75)

Season 6 (1975–76)

Season 7 (1976–77)

Season 8 (1977–78)

Season 9 (1978–79)

Single episode Emmy award notes

See also 
List of Archie Bunker's Place episodes

References 

List
Lists of American sitcom episodes